The 1993 Philadelphia Wings season marked the team's seventh season of operation.

Game log
Reference:

(p) - denotes playoff game

Roster
Reference:

See also
 Philadelphia Wings
 1993 MILL season

References

Philadelphia Wings seasons
1993 in lacrosse
Philly